Standard Chartered Thailand (officially Standard Chartered Bank (Thai) PCL) is a banking and financial services company in Thailand and a subsidiary of Standard Chartered. It serves wholesale banking customers.

History
Standard Chartered Bank has been in Thailand since 1894 when the Chartered Bank of India, Australia and China first established a branch in Bangkok.  

In 1999, Standard Chartered acquired 75 percent of the shares of Thailand's Nakornthon Bank for 12.377 billion baht (£193 million at the time). Twenty-five per cent of the shares are held by the Financial Institutions Development Fund, a fund established by the Bank of Thailand, which has recapitalised Nakornthon to approximately seven billion baht (£109 million). Nakornthon Bank was established in 1933 under the name Wang Lee Chan Bank, but changed its name to Nakornthon Bank in 1985. After the acquisition, Standard Chartered changed the bank's name to Standard Chartered Nakornthon Bank. At the time of the acquisition, Nakornthon Bank, with 67 domestic branches, was the second oldest Thai bank. With assets of approximately £1 billion, it ranked 12 of 13 Thai commercial banks by asset size.  

In 2005 Standard Chartered merged its Bangkok branch into Standard Chartered Nakornthon Bank, and renamed the new entity Standard Chartered Bank (Thai) PCL.

Banks of Thailand
Standard Chartered